The Castle of Torremormojón (Spanish: Castillo de Torremormojón) is a castle located in Torremormojón, Spain.

Conservation 
It has enjoyed protection since 1878. It has been given the heritage listing Bien de Interés Cultural, although its condition has given cause for concern.

References

See also 

 List of Bien de Interés Cultural in the Province of Palencia

Bien de Interés Cultural landmarks in the Province of Palencia
Castles in Castile and León